Motomoto, Moto-Moto, or variant, may refer to:

People
Joseph Dupont (bishop) (1850–1930, nicknamed "Moto Moto"), French Catholic missionary priest to Zambia

Characters
Moto Moto, a character from the Madagascar franchise
Daisuke Motomoto, a character from YuYu Hakusho

Places
Moto Moto Museum, Mbala, Zambia; a museum of Zambian culture, named after the bishop

Other uses
 Les Moto-Moto, a Kenyan band; see List of Wanyika bands
 "Moto Moto" (song), a 2019 song by DJ Arafat; see DJ Arafat discography
 "Moto Moto" (song), a song by Jose Chameleone

See also

 
 
 Motto Motto (disambiguation)
 Moto (disambiguation)
 Motto (disambiguation)